Admiral Harry Seawell Frank Niblett, CVO (31 October 1852 – 26 December 1939) was a Royal Navy officer before the First World War.

Niblett entered the Royal Navy, was promoted to Lieutenant on 31 March 1874, and to Commander on 1 January 1887.

He served with the Mediterranean Fleet, and was promoted to Captain on 30 June 1892. The following years he served as captain in command of HMS Northampton, HMS Edgar, HMS Diadem and HMS Canopus.

Three years later he was promoted to Rear-Admiral on 1 January 1905, and in late 1906 he was appointed in command of the Devonport Reserve division.

He was appointed a Commander of the Royal Victorian Order (CVO) in August 1907, on the occasion of the Inspection by King Edward VII of the Home Fleet.

He retired from the navy in 1910, and was promoted to Admiral on the Retired list on 20 March 1913.

References

1852 births
1939 deaths
Royal Navy admirals